Čamurlija is a village situated in Niš municipality, Nišava District in Serbia.

References

Populated places in Nišava District